= HSTR LAN =

HSTR LAN, or High Speed Turkish Remote LAN, is utilized in areas where conventional networking and communication become difficult or impossible, as in the far-eastern corners of Turkey, mainly in places like Diyarbakir.

HSTR LAN utilizes an ultra-short frequency of 1.923 gigahertz (GHz)and can upload data with speeds up to 195 gigabits (Gb) in blocks of 19 with a sample rate of 19.
